Ibrahim Abi-Ackel (born 27 March 1927) is a Brazilian politician. Ackel began his public life in 1955 as councilman in the city of Manhuaçu, Minas Gerais. He was Minister of Justice in the government of João Figueiredo from 1980 to 1985.

References

 Dicionário Histórico-Biográfico Brasileiro Pós-1930

External links
 Ibrahim Abi-Ackel 

1927 births
Living people
Ministers of Justice of Brazil
Brazilian people of Arab descent
20th-century Brazilian politicians